Tephritis crepidis is a species of tephritid or fruit flies in the genus Tephritis of the family Tephritidae.

Distribution
Netherlands, Central Europe & Ukraine South to Spain, north Italy, Bulgaria, & Caucasus.

References

Tephritinae
Insects described in 1927
Diptera of Europe